Cameron's Brewing Company is a brewery just outside of Toronto in Oakville, Ontario, Canada. Founded in 1997, it has been known to produce many different kinds of beers, including four core beers; Cameron's Cream Ale, Cameron's Auburn Ale, Cameron's Lager, and Cameron's RPA (Rye Pale Ale). 

Since 2013, Cameron has been importing their beers into the United States. They are available in Ohio, Michigan, New York, and Pennsylvania. In Canada, however, they are only available in the province of Ontario and at the Cameron's Brewing Company brewery, in the LCBO, and The Beer Store.

Distribution and retail 
While previously known for selling beer in 9-packs, Cameron exclusively sells traditional 6-packs.

Cameron's Brewing Company received 2 medals in the 2007 and 2008 Canadian Brewing Awards.  They went on to receive 3 awards in the 2009 Canadian Brewing Awards out of 4 beers submitted.

In 2010, Cameron's beers earned medals at The U.S. Open Beer Championship (Gold for Lager in the American Lager Category), and The Canadian Brewing Awards (Gold for Dark 266 and Bronze for Cream Ale).

Beers
Cream Ale
Auburn Ale
Lager
RPA (Rye Pale Ale)
226Dark
Sirius Wheat Ale
Obsidian Imperial Porter
Deviator Doppelbock
One-Eyed Grouse
White Oat Savant
Resurrection Roggenbier
Rye Bock
California Sunshine APA (American Pale Ale)
Pistols at Dawn Red Ale
Captain's Log Lager
Cruising Through the Galaxy Hazy IPA
The list of beers brewed by Cameron Brewing Company has won many awards and spans 20 years of brewing experience. In 1997, this brand started as a hobby but grew into a family-owned business.

Changes in the company in 2020 
In 2020, then president of the company Bill Coleman departed. Clint Israel was subsequently promoted to President from the sales and production department and long-time brewmaster Jason Britton was promoted into the role of Vice President

Together, Britton and Israel oversaw renovations to the company's management and facilities.

References

Beer brewing companies based in Ontario
Companies based in Oakville, Ontario